Julian Radlein (born February 6, 1981 in Kingston, Jamaica) is a former Canadian Football League fullback who played for the Hamilton Tiger-Cats. He attended Lincoln Heights Public School and Bluevale Collegiate Institute in Waterloo, Ontario.

In 2003, Radlein won the Frank M. Gibson trophy for being the outstanding rookie in the CFL East Division. Radlein was a CFLPA All-Star in the following season. He retired prior to the 2008 season.

References

Hamilton Tiger-Cats players
Canadian Football League Rookie of the Year Award winners
UBC Thunderbirds football players
University of British Columbia alumni
Living people
1981 births